The 3rd TVyNovelas Awards, is an Academy of special awards to the best of soap operas and TV shows. The awards ceremony took place on May 21, 1985 in the Centro Libanés of Mexico City, Mexico D.F. The ceremony was televised in the Mexico by Canal de las estrellas.

Claudia Córdoba and Juán Calderón hosted the show. La traición won five awards including Best Telenovela of the Year, the most for the evening. Other winners La fiera won two awards and La pasión de Isabela, Amalia Batista, Guadalupe, and Los años felices won one each.

Summary of awards and nominations

Winners and nominees

Novelas

Others

Special Awards
Best Cabaret Show: Diego Verdaguer and Amanda Miguel
International Youth Singer: Luis Miguel
Best International Production: Los cuentos de Cri-Cri, production of Miguel Alemán Velasco
Artistic Career: Miguel Manzano

Missing
People who did not attend ceremony wing and were nominated in the shortlist in each category:
Rebecca Rambal
Susana Alexander (She accepted the award in position her mother Brígida Alexander)

References 

TVyNovelas Awards
TVyNovelas Awards
TVyNovelas Awards
TVyNovelas Awards ceremonies